Elections to Larne Borough Council were held on 18 May 1977 on the same day as the other Northern Irish local government elections. The election used three district electoral areas to elect a total of 15 councillors.

Election results

Note: "Votes" are the first preference votes.

Districts summary

|- class="unsortable" align="centre"
!rowspan=2 align="left"|Ward
! % 
!Cllrs
! % 
!Cllrs
! %
!Cllrs
! %
!Cllrs
! %
!Cllrs
!rowspan=2|TotalCllrs
|- class="unsortable" align="center"
!colspan=2 bgcolor="" | Alliance
!colspan=2 bgcolor="" | Vanguard
!colspan=2 bgcolor="" | DUP
!colspan=2 bgcolor="" | UUP
!colspan=2 bgcolor="white"| Others
|-
|align="left"|Area A
|N/A
|1
|N/A
|0
|N/A
|1
|N/A
|1
|N/A
|1
|4
|-
|align="left"|Area B
|21.5
|1
|23.3
|1
|bgcolor="D46A4C"|36.9
|bgcolor="D46A4C"|1
|18.3
|1
|0.0
|0
|4
|-
|align="left"|Area C
|27.7
|2
|bgcolor="darkorange"|28.8
|bgcolor="darkorange"|2
|19.7
|1
|1.7
|0
|22.1
|2
|7
|-
|- class="unsortable" class="sortbottom" style="background:#C9C9C9"
|align="left"| Total
|25.8
|4
|27.2
|3
|24.9
|3
|6.8
|2
|15.3
|3
|15
|-
|}

Districts results

Area A

1973: 1 x Alliance, 1 x UUP, 1 x Loyalist, 1 x Independent
1977: 1 x Alliance, 1 x UUP, 1 x DUP, 1 x SDLP
1973-1977 Change: SDLP gain from Independent, Loyalist joins DUP

As only four candidates had been nominated for four seats, there was no vote in Area A and all four candidates were deemed elected.

Area B

1973: 3 x Loyalist, 1 x Independent Unionist
1977: 1 x DUP, 1 x Vanguard, 1 x Alliance, 1 x UUP
1973-1977 Change: Vanguard and Alliance gain from Loyalist (two seats), Loyalist joins DUP and Independent Unionist joins UUP

Area C

1973: 4 x Loyalist, 2 x Alliance, 1 x Independent
1977: 2 x Alliance, 2 x Vanguard, 2 x Independent, 1 x DUP
1973-1977 Change: Independent gain from Loyalist, Loyalist (three seats) join Vanguard (two seats) and DUP

References

Larne Borough Council elections
Larne